Alyaksandr Yadeshka (born 28 January 1993) is a Belarusian former professional football player.

Career
His latest club was Neman Grodno, where he played until the end of the 2015 season.

External links
 

1993 births
Living people
Belarusian footballers
FC Neman Grodno players
FC Khimik Svetlogorsk players
FC Gorodeya players
Association football forwards